Ernest Anselm LeCours (August 6, 1911 – March 10, 1993) was a Canadian politician. He served in the Legislative Assembly of British Columbia from 1964 to 1972, as a Social Credit member for the constituency of Richmond.

References

British Columbia Social Credit Party MLAs
1911 births
1993 deaths